Pu-Men High School (Fo Guang Shan Pu-Men High School) (Traditional Chinese: 普門中學 or 佛光山私立普門中學) is a private Buddhist high school located in Dashu District, Kaohsiung, Taiwan. The school is affiliated with the Fo Guang Shan Buddhist order founded by Venerable Master Hsing Yun.

In 1977, the name was changed to Fo Guang Shan Private Pumen Senior High School, and the  school was given to Fo Guang Shan. The school converted officially to Kaohsiung County Private-Operated Pu-Men Senior High School on August 1977.

Founding principles 
 Pu-Men, the Universal Door, is open to save all beings and to disseminate the spirit of the Guan Yin, the Bodhisattva of Compassion.
 Pu-Men believe in the importance of a Confucian education.
 Pu-Men is founded on Buddhism’s spirit of saving the world with an ideal education, great mercy, equality for all and unselfishness.
 Pu-Men strives to cultivate talents and virtues in youths by emphasizing intellectualism, morality, physical  well being and an appreciation of the aesthetics, to benefit all societies and all nations.

External links 
 Pu-Men High School
 Pumen Student Digital System
 Fo Guang Shan
 BLIA World Headquarters
BLIA Taiwan
BLIA Young Adult Division
 BLIA Youth Text

Fo Guang Shan
Schools in Kaohsiung
High schools in Taiwan
Buddhist schools in Taiwan
1977 establishments in Taiwan